WALS (102.1 FM) is an American radio station broadcasting a country music format. Licensed to Oglesby, Illinois, United States, the station serves the LaSalle-Peru area.  Branded as WALLS 102, the station is currently owned by Laco Radio and featured programming from Jones Radio Network until February 2007, when Jones programming was dropped in favor of local talent. The flagship program is "The Morning Show with Dani" weekday mornings from 6 AM - 10 AM.

History
The station was assigned the call sign WZLC on February 26, 1993.  At first, it simulcast the country music format of co-owned WGLC (Mendota, Illinois).  WZLC was put on the air to give WGLC coverage in the southern part of the La Salle/Peru area. On February 1, 1995, the station changed its call sign to the current WALS and started carrying separate country music programming.

On January 24, 2023, it was announced that Studstill Media had sold WALS, along with its sister stations, to Shaw Media in Crystal Lake, Illinois, for a total of $1.8 million. The sale is presently under FCC review with anticipation of being completed later in the year.

References

External links

ALS
Country radio stations in the United States
LaSalle County, Illinois